Solem Ridge is a mostly snow-covered, arc-shaped ridge, 4 nautical miles (7 km) long, located 10 nautical miles (18 km) north-northeast of Mount Jackson in Palmer Land. Mapped by United States Geological Survey (USGS) in 1974. Named by Advisory Committee on Antarctic Names (US-ACAN) for Lieutenant Lynn D. Solem, U.S. Navy, Medical Officer at the South Pole Station, 1972.

Ridges of Palmer Land